Denison River is a river in South West Tasmania, Australia. It is within the South West Wilderness, and drains into the Gordon River below the Gordon Splits. Its catchment starts in the south of the King William Range.

It lies to the east of the Prince of Wales Range (Tasmania), north west of Gordon Dam and Lake Gordon, and west of The Spires (Tasmania).

The river was travelled and photographed by Peter Dombrovskis

In 1989 a survey of the river valley was undertaken to check for aboriginal sites. Seven archaeological sites were identified.

Notes

Further reading
 
 Gee, H and Fenton, J. (Eds) (1978)  The South West Book - A Tasmanian Wilderness Melbourne, Australian Conservation Foundation. 
 Neilson, D. (1975)  South West Tasmania - A land of the Wild. Adelaide. Rigby. 

Rivers of Tasmania
South West Tasmania